Daman and Diu Cricket Association is the governing body of the Cricket activities in the Union Territory of Daman and Diu in India and the Daman and Diu cricket team. It is not affiliated to the Board of Control for Cricket in India. However it is affiliated to Gujarat Cricket Association as a District Association.

References

Cricket administration in India
Sport in Daman and Diu